"Headsprung" is a song by American hip hop artist LL Cool J. It was released on June 7, 2004 as the lead single from his eleventh album, The DEFinition. The song was a success on the charts, it peaked at number 16 on the Billboard Hot 100, number 4 on the Hot Rap Songs and number 7 on the Hot R&B/Hip-Hop Songs.

Keri Hilson did a cover of this song featuring Justin Timberlake, the cover was used as a remix with LL Cool J's 1st verse. A version of this song, however without Timberlake, has appears, renamed, as the title track for Hilson's 2009 compilation album, Ms. Keri.

Critical reception
AllMusic's David Jeffries praised the song as a change from the slow jams of LL's 10, highlighting the southern production and New York style vocal delivery as a great merger, concluding that, "Simple, club, crunk, and not the kind of revolution Timbaland or LL Cool J can crank out when on fire, but solid enough to put the rapper back on top of the beatbox." Rashaun Hall of Billboard was mixed on the song, commending LL's attempt to adapt to the crunk style but felt the hook was "derivative" and that Timbaland's production overpowered him, concluding that "For better or for worse, "Headsprung" marks LL Cool J's continued evolution as an artist." Nick Southall of Stylus Magazine said that it was "a hit but not a monster."

Formats and track listing
Europe CD (Promo)
"Headsprung" (Radio Edit) – 3:55

UK CD
"Headsprung" (Album Version) – 4:27
"Feel the Beat" (Album Version) – 4:17

US 12" (Promo)
"Headsprung" (Radio Edit) – 3:55
"Headsprung" (Instrumental) – 4:27
"Feel the Beat" (Radio Edit) – 3:48
"Feel the Beat" (Instrumental) – 4:20

US CD (Promo)
"Headsprung" (Radio) – 3:58
"Headsprung" (Instrumental) – 4:31
"Call Out" – 0:11

Charts and certifications

Weekly charts

Certifications

Year-end charts

Release history

References

2004 singles
2004 songs
LL Cool J songs
Def Jam Recordings singles
Song recordings produced by Timbaland
Songs written by LL Cool J